Glyptothorax chimtuipuiensis is a species of catfish that was first described by Anganthoibi and Vishwanath 2010. Glyptothorax chimtuipuiensis is a species in genus Glyptothorax, family Sisoridae and order Siluriformes. IUCN categorise the species as insufficiently studied globally. No subspecies are listed in Catalogue of Life.

References 

Glyptothorax
Taxa named by Nongmaithem Anganthoibi
Taxa named by Waikhom Vishwanath
Fish described in 2010